The 10th Australian Academy of Cinema and Television Arts International Awards, commonly known as the AACTA International Awards, is presented by the Australian Academy of Cinema and Television Arts (AACTA), a non-profit organisation whose aim is to identify, award, promote and celebrate Australia's greatest achievements in film and television. Awards were handed out for the best films of 2020 regardless of the country of origin, and are the international counterpart to the awards for Australian films.

Nominations were announced on 12 February 2021. The categories were also expanded to recognize television productions with four categories: Best Comedy Series, Best Drama Series, Best Actor in a Series, and Best Actress in a Series. Winners were announced on 5 March 2021.

Winners and nominees

Film

Television

References

External links
 The Official Australian Academy of Cinema and Television Arts website

AACTA International Awards
AACTA International Awards
AACTA Awards ceremonies
AACTA International
2020 in American cinema
AACTA Awards